Jamie Stevenson (born 25 March 1975) is a British orienteering champion. In 2003 he won the gold medal in the sprint distance at the World Orienteering Championships. He was the first and, to-date, the only British male orienteering world champion (Yvette Baker won the short distance race at the 1999 world championships).

Stevenson won a second individual world championship medal in Denmark in 2006, with a third place in the middle distance category.

He also holds two world relay medals running the anchor leg for Great Britain: Bronze in 2003 and Gold in 2008.

Background
Stevenson was born on 25 March 1975 in Scotland. He was educated at Daniel Stewart's and Melville College in Edinburgh. He studied at the University of Sheffield.

Orienteering
He has also raced for Swedish (IFK Göteborg) and Danish clubs. While living in Sweden he won the Swedish long distance championships. He now lives in Denmark. At international level he was a member of the British relay team which won the prestigious Nordic Championships in 2001, the relay bronze medal at the 2003 World Championships in Switzerland and the relay gold medal at the 2008 World Championships. In 2006 he won the Danish 4 km Short Course Cross Country Championships held in Helsingør.

In August 2002 Stevenson briefly topped the world orienteering rankings.

He appeared on the TV sports quiz They Think It's All Over in 2003 after winning the gold medal in the sprint distance at the World Orienteering Championships.

He also holds two world relay medals running the anchor leg for Great Britain in 2003 to take Bronze (with Dan Marsden and Jon Duncan) and Gold in 2008 with Graham Gristwood and Jon Duncan. Jamie Stevenson has won the British Orienteering Championships in all disciplines except for Night Orienteering.

See also
 List of orienteers
 List of orienteering events

References

External links
 
 

1975 births
Living people
Scottish orienteers
British orienteers
Male orienteers
Foot orienteers
World Orienteering Championships medalists
People educated at Stewart's Melville College
Alumni of the University of Sheffield
World Games bronze medalists
Competitors at the 2001 World Games